Abdulaziz bin Mohammed Al-Onaizan is a Saudi Arabian businessman who currently serves as chief executive officer of Bank Albilad. Al-Onaizan joined Bank Albilad in 2014, where he served as a chief business officer. In 2016, he was appointed as the bank's chief executive officer.

Early life and education
Al-Onaizan was born in Saudi Arabia and raised in Ar-Rass. He attended Ar-Rass Secondary School for high school. He then moved to Riyadh for college and attended King Saud University. In 1987, he obtained his bachelor's degree on quantitative methods.

Career
In 1991, Al-Onaizan joined Samba Financial Group. He then joined Arab National Bank in 2004 and Alinma Bank In 2008. In 2014, Al-Onaizan joined Bank Albilad as the chief business officer (CBO). In 2016, he was appointed as the chief executive officer (CEO) of Bank Albilad. He is the Board and Executive committee member of the Albilad Investing Company.

Personal life 
Al-Onaizan resides in Riyadh, the capital city of Saudi Arabia. He is a Sunni-Muslim, and speaks Arabic and English.

References

1966 births
20th-century businesspeople
20th-century Muslims
20th-century Saudi Arabian businesspeople
20th-century Saudi Arabian people
21st-century businesspeople
21st-century Muslims
21st-century Saudi Arabian businesspeople
21st-century Saudi Arabian people
Arab Muslims
Arabic-speaking people
Bank presidents and chief executive officers
Chief executives in the finance industry
Chief executive officers
Living people
People from Al-Qassim Province
People from Ar Rass
People from Riyadh
Saudi Arabian bankers
Saudi Arabian business executives
Saudi Arabian businesspeople
Saudi Arabian chief executives
Saudi Arabian investment bankers
Saudi Arabian Muslims
Saudi Arabian people
Saudi Arabian Sunni Muslims